The University of Minnesota College of Liberal Arts (CLA) is the largest college of the University of Minnesota in the Twin Cities of Minnesota. Established in 1868, the College of Liberal Arts offers more than 65 majors and 70 minors to its more than 13,600 undergraduate students, as well as more than two dozen majors to its 1,500 graduate students. The various departments of the College of Liberal Arts are housed in several buildings located in both the East Bank and West Bank areas of the university's Minneapolis campus.

Academic majors and minors

The College of Liberal Arts offers numerous programs of study. A partial list includes:

Acting
African American and African Studies
American Indian Studies
American Studies
Anthropology
Art
Art History
Asian and Middle Eastern Studies
Astrophysics
Biblical Studies
Biology, Society, & Environment
Chemistry
Chicano-Latino Studies
Child Psychology
Classics
Communication Studies
Computer Science
Cultural Studies and Comparative Literature
Dance
Developmental Psychology
Earth Sciences
Economics
Economics - Quantitative Emphasis
English
Environmental Geosciences
French Studies
French and Italian Studies
Gender, Women, and Sexuality Studies
Geography
German, Scandinavian & Dutch Studies
Global Studies
History
Human Physiology
Individualized Studies
Individually Designed Interdepartmental B.A.
Italian Studies
Jewish Studies
Journalism
Linguistics
Mass Communication
Mathematics
Music
Music Education
Music Therapy
Ojibwe Language
Philosophy
Physics
Physiology
Political Science
Psychology
Religious Studies
Russian
Sociology
Sociology of Law, Criminology, and Deviance
Spanish Studies
Spanish and Portuguese Studies
Speech-Language-Hearing Sciences
Statistics
Strategic Communication: Advertising & Public Relations
Studies in Cinema & Media Culture
Technical Writing & Communication
Theatre Arts
Urban Studies

References

External links
University of Minnesota College of Liberal Arts

Liberal arts colleges at universities in the United States
University of Minnesota
Educational institutions established in 1868
1868 establishments in Minnesota